Abdi Hasan Awale or Abdi Qeybdiid (born 1948) is a Somali politician.

Personal life 
Abdi Hasan Awale was born in 1948 in Galkacyo, Somalia. He is a member of the Sacad sub-clan of the Habar Gedir clans.

Political career
Qeybdiid rose to prominence as Mohammed Farrah Aidid's interior minister in its clashes with UN forces during the so-called "nation-building" phase of UNOSOM II in 1993. 

On 3 October 1993, an assault force of Delta Force commandos backed up by nearly 140 United States Army Rangers and four US Army Special Forces operators under the command of Maj. Gen. William F. Garrison and Col. Lee Van Arsdale captured Qeybdiid together with Omar Salad Elmi, Aidid's Foreign Minister. He stayed in American custody for some months. The arrest led to the Battle of Mogadishu and is portrayed in the film Black Hawk Down.

By 2001, he was the chief of police over Mogadishu as part of the new Transitional National Government (TNG).

In 2006, he fought with the Alliance for the Restoration of Peace and Counter-Terrorism (ARPCT) against the Islamic Courts Union in the Second Battle of Mogadishu. They surrendered on 11 July 2006, the last Alliance forces to do so.

He defected from the alliance in June 2006, saying that “Since the formation of ARPCT, Mogadishu has been a centre of a military crisis that has led to the needless death of hundreds of people, therefore I decide to quit the alliance to build on the gains of the Islamic tribunals and give peace a chance”.

On January 1, 2007, he returned to Mogadishu where he pleaded for there to be no reprisals against the defeated Islamists.

He was elected on 1 August 2012 as the new president of Galmudug state, a semi-autonomous region in Somalia. In December 2006, he led an engagement on behalf of the Transitional Federal Government (TFG), backed by a sizable contingent of Ethiopian troops, known as the Battle of Bandiradley. He is also the "Tiger Abdi" of the July 12, 1993 Abdi House Raid, which presaged the First Battle of Mogadishu.

References

Presidents of Galmudug
Somalian police chiefs
Living people
Somalian faction leaders
1948 births
Somali National Alliance politicians
Battle of Mogadishu (1993)